GFCF  may refer to:
 Gross fixed capital formation, a macroeconomic concept used in official national accounts
 Gluten-free, casein-free diet, a diet that eliminates intake of gluten and casein